Argayash is a rural locality (a selo) and the administrative center of Argayashsky District of Chelyabinsk Oblast, Russia. Population: 

Between 1930 and 1934 Argayash served as the administrative center of Argayash National Okrug.

References

Notes

Sources

Rural localities in Chelyabinsk Oblast